Ayoka Lee (born August 12, 2000) is an American college basketball player for the Kansas State Wildcats of the Big 12 Conference. She holds the NCAA Division I women's single-game scoring record with 61 points.

High school career
Lee played basketball for Byron High School in Byron, Minnesota. In her sophomore season, she averaged 24.6 points, 13.8 rebounds and 4.5 blocks per game and was named to the Class 3A All-State team. As a junior, Lee averaged 24.9 points, 16.4 rebounds and 4.1 blocks per game, repeating as a Class 3A All-State selection. In her senior season, she averaged 26.6 points, 15.7 rebounds and 5.5 blocks per game. She scored a school-record 54 points against Cotter High School during the Section 1AA tournament. Lee tore her anterior cruciate ligament (ACL) during the state tournament. She earned Class 2A All-State honors and was a finalist for the Minnesota Miss Basketball award. Lee set career and single-season program records for points, rebounds and field goal percentage. In high school, she also competed in volleyball for three years and track and field for two years at the varsity level. A three-star recruit, she committed to playing college basketball for Kansas State.

College career
Lee redshirted her first season at Kansas State to rehabilitate from her torn ACL and was a part of the practice squad. On January 25, 2020, she recorded 23 points, 20 rebounds and five blocks in a 92–74 win against Oklahoma, the first 20-point, 20-rebound game in program history. On February 16, she matched her season-high of 24 points while recording 13 rebounds, four blocks and three steals in an 87–85 win against Oklahoma. As a freshman, Lee averaged 15.7 points, 11.4 rebounds and 3.1 blocks per game, earning first-team All-Big 12 and Freshman of the Year recognition. She set the conference record by winning the Big 12 Freshman of the Week award 12 times. On January 31, 2021, Lee posted a sophomore season-high 37 points and 18 rebounds in an 80–70 loss to Oklahoma, scoring the most points by a Kansas State player during a Big 12 game. She averaged 19.1 points, 8.7 rebounds and two blocks per game as a sophomore and was named first-team All-Big 12 for a second time.

In her junior season debut on November 9, 2021, Lee broke the program single-game scoring record with 43 points, nine rebounds, four blocks and three steals in a 103–40 victory over Central Arkansas. On December 11, Lee posted 38 points, 14 rebounds and six blocks in a 79–73 win against South Dakota State. On January 11, 2021, she had 38 points and 11 rebounds in a 73–70 loss to Iowa State. On January 23, Lee set the NCAA Division I women's single-game scoring record with 61 points in a 94–65 win over Oklahoma. During the game, she also had 12 rebounds and three blocks. As a junior, Lee averaged 22 points, 10.3 rebounds and 2.9 blocks per game. She earned her third consecutive first-team All-Big 12 selection and was named a second-team All-American by the Associated Press and the United States Basketball Writers Association. Lee opted to return to Kansas State for her senior season instead of entering the 2022 WNBA draft.

Personal life
Lee's younger brother, Ahjany, plays college basketball for St. Thomas (Minnesota), and her older brother, Ahymad, played at Byron High School. She graduated from Kansas State University with a bachelor's degree in psychology and is pursuing a master's degree in couples and family therapy. Lee was named a second-team Academic All-American by the College Sports Information Directors of America (CoSIDA) as a sophomore. She earned first-team Academic All-American and Big 12 Scholar-Athlete of the Year honors in her junior year.

References

External links
Kansas State Wildcats bio

2000 births
Living people
American women's basketball players
Centers (basketball)
Basketball players from Minnesota
Kansas State Wildcats women's basketball players